The tribe Fabeae (sometimes referred to as "Vicieae") is one of the subdivisions of the plant family Fabaceae. It is included within the Inverted repeat-lacking clade (IRLC). Five genera are included:
 Lathyrus L. (vetchlings)
 Lens Mill. (lentils)
 Pisum L. (peas)
 Vavilovia Fed.

 Vicia L. (vetches)

References

External links

 
Fabaceae tribes
Taxa named by Ludwig Reichenbach